Maurice Goldhaber (April 18, 1911 – May 11, 2011) was an American physicist, who in 1957 (with Lee Grodzins and Andrew Sunyar) established that neutrinos have negative helicity.

Early life and childhood
He was born on April 18, 1911, in Lemberg, Austria, now called Lviv, Ukraine to a Jewish family. His son Alfred Goldhaber is a professor at the C. N. Yang Institute for Theoretical Physics at SUNY Stony Brook. His grandson, David Goldhaber-Gordon is a Physics Professor at Stanford University.

Education
After beginning his physics studies at the University of Berlin, he earned his doctorate at Cambridge University in 1936, belonging to Magdalene College.

Career
In 1934, working at the Cavendish Laboratory in Cambridge, England he and James Chadwick, through what they called the nuclear photo-electric effect, established that the neutron has a great enough mass over the proton to decay.

He moved to the University of Illinois in 1938. In the 1940s with his wife Gertrude Scharff-Goldhaber he established that beta particles are identical to electrons.
 
He joined Brookhaven National Laboratory in 1950. With Edward Teller he proposed that the so-called "giant-dipole nuclear resonance" was due to the neutrons in a nucleus vibrating as a group against the protons as a group (Goldhaber-Teller model).

He  made a well-known bet with Hartland Snyder in about 1955 that anti-protons could not exist; when he lost the bet, he speculated  that the reason anti-matter does not appear to be abundant in the universe is that before the Big Bang, a single particle, the "universon"  existed that then decayed into "cosmon" and  "anti-cosmon," and that the cosmon subsequently decayed to produce the known cosmos. In the 1950s also he speculated that all fermions such as electrons, protons and neutrons are "doubled," that is that each is associated with a similar heavier particle. He also speculated that in what became known as the Goldhaber-Christie model, the so-called strange particles were composites of just 3 basic particles. He was Director of Brookhaven National Laboratory  from 1961 to 1973.

Among his many other awards, he won the National Medal of Science in 1983, the Golden Plate Award of the American Academy of Achievement in 1985, the Wolf Prize in 1991, the J. Robert Oppenheimer Memorial Prize in 1982 (shared with Robert Marshak), and the Fermi Award in 1998. He was an elected member of the United States National Academy of Sciences, the American Academy of Arts and Sciences, and the American Philosophical Society.

Maurice Goldhaber's brother Gerson Goldhaber was a professor of physics at the University of California Berkeley; his son Alfred Scharff Goldhaber is a professor of physics at SUNY Stony Brook; his grandson (son of Alfred) David Goldhaber-Gordon is a professor of physics at Stanford.

Death
Goldhaber died May 11, 2011, at his home in East Setauket, New York at 100.

Legacy
In 2001, Brookhaven National Laboratory created the Gertrude and Maurice Goldhaber Distinguished Fellowships in his honor. These Fellowships are awarded to early-career scientists with exceptional talent and credentials who have a strong desire for independent research at the frontiers of their fields.

References
 G. Feinberg, A.W. Sunyar, J. Weneser, A Festschrift for Maurice Goldhaber, New York Academy of Sciences (1993),

External links 

 BNL celebrates Goldhaber's 90th year
 Description of Goldhaber's spinning neutrino experiment
 Biography of Maurice Goldhaber at Fermi Award website
 Oral History interview transcript with Maurice Goldhaber 10 January 1967, American Institute of Physics, Niels Bohr Library and Archives

1911 births
2011 deaths
American physicists
American nuclear physicists
Austrian physicists
Austrian nuclear physicists
National Medal of Science laureates
Enrico Fermi Award recipients
Wolf Prize in Physics laureates
Jews from Galicia (Eastern Europe)
Austrian Jews
American people of Austrian-Jewish descent
Jewish American scientists
People from the Kingdom of Galicia and Lodomeria
Scientists from Lviv
Alumni of Magdalene College, Cambridge
Brookhaven National Laboratory staff
American centenarians
Austrian centenarians
Men centenarians
Members of the United States National Academy of Sciences
People from East Setauket, New York
Jewish physicists
Scientists from New York (state)
21st-century American Jews
Austrian emigrants to the United States
Members of the American Philosophical Society
Presidents of the American Physical Society